Buddhism in Vietnam (Đạo Phật 道佛 or Phật Giáo 佛教 in Vietnamese), as practiced by the ethnic Vietnamese, is mainly of the Mahayana tradition and is the main religion. Buddhism may have first come to Vietnam as early as the 3rd or 2nd century BCE from the Indian subcontinent or from China in the 1st or 2nd century CE. Vietnamese Buddhism has had a syncretic relationship with certain elements of Taoism, Chinese spirituality, and Vietnamese folk religion.

History

Dynastic period
There are conflicting theories regarding whether Buddhism first reached Vietnam during the 3rd or 2nd century BCE via delegations from India, or during the 1st or 2nd century from China. In either case, by the end of the 2nd century CE, Vietnam had developed into a major regional Mahayana Buddhist hub, centering on Luy Lâu in modern Bắc Ninh Province, northeast of the present-day capital city of Hanoi. Luy Lâu was the capital of the Han region of Jiaozhi and was a popular destination visited by many Indian Buddhist missionary monks en route to China. The monks followed the maritime trade route from the Indian subcontinent to China used by Indian traders. A number of Mahayana sutras and the āgamas were translated into Classical Chinese there, including the Sutra of Forty-two Chapters and the Anapanasati.

Jiaozhi was the birthplace of Buddhist missionary Kang Senghui, who was of Sogdian origin.

Over the next eighteen centuries, Vietnam and China shared many common features of cultural, philosophical and religious heritage as a result of geographical proximity and Vietnam being annexed twice by China. Vietnamese Buddhism is thus related to Chinese Buddhism in general, and to some extent reflects the formation of Chinese Buddhism after the Song dynasty. Meanwhile, in 875 new Cham king Indravarman II who was a devout Zen Buddhist, established Mahayana Buddhism as Champa's state religion, and built the large monastery complex of Đồng Dương. His dynasty continued to rule Champa until the late 10th century.

During the Đinh dynasty (968–980), Mahayana Buddhism was recognized by the state as an official religion (~971), reflecting the high esteem of Buddhist faith held by the Vietnamese monarchs, included some influences from the Vajrayana section. The Early Lê dynasty (980–1009) also afforded the same recognition to the Buddhist sangha. The growth of Buddhism during this time is attributed to the recruitment of erudite monks to the court as the newly independent state needed an ideological basis on which to build a country. Subsequently, this role was ceded to Confucianism.

Vietnamese Buddhism reached its zenith during the Lý dynasty (1009–1225), beginning with the founder Lý Thái Tổ, who was raised in a Buddhist temple. All of the emperors during the Lý dynasty professed and sanctioned Buddhism as the state religion. This endured with the Trần dynasty (1225–1400), but Buddhism had to share the stage with the emerging growth of Confucianism.

By the 15th century, Buddhism fell out of favor with the court during the Later Lê dynasty, although still popular with the masses. Officials like Lê Quát attacked it as heretical and wasteful. It was not until the 19th century that Buddhism regained some stature under the Nguyễn dynasty, which accorded royal support.

A Buddhist revival movement (Chấn hưng Phật giáo) emerged in the 1920s in an effort to reform and strengthen institutional Buddhism, which had lost grounds to the spread of Christianity and the growth of other faiths under French rule. The movement continued into the 1950s.

Republican period

From 1954 to 1975, Vietnam was split into North and South Vietnam. In a country where surveys of the religious composition estimated the Buddhist majority to be approximately 50 to 70 percent, South Vietnamese President Ngô Đình Diệm's policies generated claims of religious bias. As a member of the Catholic Vietnamese minority, he pursued pro-Catholic policies that antagonized many Buddhists.

In May 1963, in the central city of Huế, where Diệm's elder brother Ngô Đình Thục was the archbishop, Buddhists were prohibited from displaying Buddhist flags during Vesak celebrations. Yet few days earlier, Catholics were allowed to fly religious flags at a celebration in honour of the newly-seated archbishop. This led to widespread protest against the government; troops were sent in, and nine civilians were killed in the confrontations. This led to mass rallies against Diệm's government, termed as the Buddhist crisis. The conflicts culminated in Thích Quảng Đức's self-immolation by lighting himself on fire in protest of the persecution of Buddhists. President Diệm's younger brother Ngô Đình Nhu favored strong-armed tactics, and Army of the Republic of Vietnam Special Forces engaged in the Xá Lợi Pagoda raids, killing estimated hundreds. Dismayed by the public outrage, the U.S. government withdrew support for the regime. President Diệm was deposed and killed in the 1963 coup.

Political strength of the Buddhists grew in the 1960s as different schools and orders convene to form the Unified Buddhist Sangha of Vietnam. Leaders of the Sangha like Thích Trí Quang had considerable sway in national politics, at times challenging the government.

With the fall of Saigon in 1975, the whole nation came under Communist rule; many religious practices including Buddhism were discouraged. In the North, the government had created the United Buddhist Sangha of Vietnam, co-opting the clergy to function under government auspices, but in the South, the Unified Buddhist Sangha of Vietnam still held sway and openly challenged the communist government.  The Sangha leadership was thus arrested and imprisoned; Sangha properties were seized and the Sangha itself was outlawed. In its place was the newly created Buddhist Sangha of Vietnam, designed as the final union of all Buddhist organizations, now under full state control.

Modern period
The treatment of Buddhists started to ease since Đổi mới in 1986.

Since Đổi Mới in 1986, many reforms have allowed Buddhists to practice their religion relatively unhindered. However, no organized sangha is allowed to function independent of the state. It was not until 2007 that Pure Land Buddhism, the most widespread type of Buddhism practiced in Vietnam, was officially recognized as a religion by the government. Thích Quảng Độ, the Patriarch of the Unified Buddhist Sangha, once imprisoned, remained under surveillance and restricted in his travels until his death.

Today, Buddhists are found throughout Vietnam, from North to South. Buddhism is the single largest organized religion in Vietnam, with somewhere between 12.2% and 16.4% of the population identifying themselves as Buddhist. Some argued that the number is higher than reported, as many declared themselves as atheists but still participate in Buddhist activities.

Though the Communist Party of Vietnam officially promotes atheism, it has usually leaned in favor of Buddhism, as Buddhism is associated with the long and deep history of Vietnam. Also, there have rarely been disputes between Buddhists and the Government; the Communist Government also sees Buddhism as a symbol of Vietnamese patriotism. Buddhist festivals are officially promoted by the Government and restrictions are few, in contrast to its Christian, Muslim and other religious counterparts.

Recently, the Communist regime in Vietnam allowed major Buddhist figures to enter the country. Thích Nhất Hạnh, an influential Buddhist figure revered both in Vietnam and worldwide, is among these. In order to distance itself from the fellow communist neighbor China, the Government of Vietnam allows the publishing of books and stories of 14th Dalai Lama, who has a personal friendship with Thích Nhất Hạnh and were commonly critical of the Chinese regime after the 2008 Tibetan unrest, which was seen as an attempt to antagonize the Chinese Government and China as a whole, as Beijing still considers the Dalai Lama to be a terrorist.

Overseas

After the fall of South Vietnam to the Communist North in 1975 at the end of the Vietnam War, the first major Buddhist community appeared in North America. Since this time, the North American Vietnamese Buddhist community has grown to some 160 temples and centers. Proselytizing is not a priority.

The most famous practitioner of synchronized Vietnamese Thiền in the West is Thích Nhất Hạnh, who has authored dozens of books and founded the Plum Village Monastery in France together with his colleague, bhikṣuṇī and Zen Master Chân Không. According to Nguyen and Barber, Thích Nhất Hạnh's fame in the Western world as a proponent of engaged Buddhism and a new Thiền style has "no affinity with or any foundation in traditional Vietnamese Buddhist practices", and according to Alexander Soucy (2007), his style of Zen Buddhism is not reflective of actual Vietnamese Buddhism. These claims are contradicted by Elise Anne DeVido, who examined the life and legacy of Thích Nhất Hạnh and how we can understand his teachings in terms of its Vietnamese origins. Thích Nhất Hạnh also often recounts about his early Thiền practices in Vietnam in his Dharma talks, saying that he continued and developed this practice in the West, which has a distinctive Vietnamese Thiền flavor.

Thích Nhất Hạnh's Buddhist teachings have started to return to Vietnam, where the Buddhist landscape is now being shaped by the combined Vietnamese and Westernized Buddhism that is focused more on the meditative practices.

Practice

Followers in Vietnam practice differing traditions without any problem or sense of contradiction. Few Vietnamese Buddhists would identify themselves as a particular kind of Buddhism, as a Christian might identify themself by a denomination, for example. Although Vietnamese Buddhism does not have a strong centralized structure, the practice is similar throughout the country at almost any temple.

Gaining merit is the most common and essential practice in Vietnamese Buddhism with a belief that liberation takes place with the help of Buddhas and bodhisattvas. Buddhist monks commonly chant sutras, recite Buddhas’ names (particularly Amitābha), doing repentance, and praying for rebirth in the Pure Land.

The Lotus Sutra and the Amitabha Sutra are the most commonly used sutras. Most sutras and texts are in Văn ngôn and are merely recited with Sino-Xenic pronunciations, making them incomprehensible to most practitioners.

Three services are practiced regularly at dawn, noon, and dusk. They include sutra reading with niệm Phật and dhāraṇī, including the Chú Đại Bi (the Nīlakaṇṭha Dhāraṇī), recitation and kinh hành (walking meditation). Laypeople at times join the services at the temple, and some devout Buddhist practice the services at home. Special services such as sám nguyện/sám hối (confession/repentance) takes place on the full moon and new moon each month. The niệm Phật practice is one way of repenting and purifying bad karma.

Buddhist temples also serve a significant role in death rituals and funerals among overseas Vietnamese.

The Chú Đại Bi
At the entrance of many pagodas, especially in tourist places, the Chú Đại Bi (Vietnamese version of the Chinese 大悲咒 Dàbēi zhòu, the Nīlakaṇṭha Dhāraṇī or Great Compassion Dharani or Mantra), is made available to visitors, either printed on a single sheet in black and white, or as a color booklet on glossy paper. They are printed on the initiative of Buddhist practitioners who make an offering to the sangha.
 

Text

The  Chú Đại Bi (Vietnamese translation of the Chinese title 大悲咒 Dàbēi zhòu), is divided into 84 verses and available in either unnumbered or numbered versions. The text recited in religious services is a transcription into modern Vietnamese (Chữ Quốc ngữ) from the ancient Vietnamese (Chữ Nôm and Chữ Hán) text, which was itself a transcription from Chinese (not a traduction). The following translations into modern Vietnamese and English are based on the work of Vietnamese historian Lê Tự Hỷ  and Indian historian Lokesh Chandra.  A reconstruction in Sanskrit IAST from the original text, by Lê Tự Hỷ, is also proposed.
 
{|role= "presentation" class="wikitable mw-collapsible mw-collapsed" scope=col style="width: 1050px;"
|-
|style="text-align:center;"| Chú Đại Bi1 & 2. Transcription and traduction from ancient Vietnamese (Chữ Nôm and Chữ Hán) to modern Vietnamese (Chữ Quốc ngữ) and translation in English.3. Reconstructed text in Sanskrit IAST.
|-
|-style="background: #FFFFFF; color: black"
| * 1. Text without the numbering of the verses.The following text is the transcription into modern Vietnamese (chữ Quốc ngữ) from Old Vietnamese (Chữ Nôm and Chữ Hán) version, itself a transliteration from the Chinese 大悲咒 Dàbēi zhòu :
Nam mô hắc ra đát na đa ra dạ da. Nam mô a rị da, bà lô yết đế, thước bác ra da, bồ đề tát đỏa bà da, ma ha tát đỏa bà da, ma ha ca lô ni ca da. Án tát bàn ra phạt duệ, số đát na đá tỏa.
Nam mô tất kiết lật đỏa, y mông a rị da bà lô kiết đế, thất phật ra lăng đà bà.
Nam mô na ra cẩn trì hế rị, ma ha bàn đá sa mế, tát bà a tha đậu du bằng a thể dựng, tát bà tát đa, na ma bà gìa ma phạt đạt đậu, đát thiệt tha. Án, a bà lô hê, lô ca đế, ca ra đế, di hê rị, ma ha bồ đề tát đỏa, tát bà tát bà, ma ra ma ra, ma hê ma hê, rị đàn dựng cu lô cu lô kiết mông độ lô độ lô, phạt xà da đế, ma ha phạt xà da đế, đà ra đà ra, địa rị ni, thất Phật ra da, dá ra dá ra. Mạ mạ phạt ma ra, mục đế lệ, y hê y hê, thất na thất na, a ra sâm Phật ra xá lợi, phạt sa phạt sâm, Phật ra xá da, hô lô hô lô ma ra, hô lô hô lô hê rị, ta ra ta ra, tất rị tất rị, tô rô tô rô bồ đề dạ, bồ đề dạ, bồ đà dạ, bồ đà dạ, di đế rị dạ, na ra cẩn trì địa rị sắc ni na, ba dạ ma na ta bà ha. Tất đà dạ ta bà ha. Ma ha tất đà dạ ta bà ha. Tất đà du nghệ thất bàn ra dạ ta bà ha. Na ra cẩn trì. Ta bà ha. Ma ra na ra. Ta bà ha.  Tất ra tăng a mục khê da, ta bà ha. Ta bà ma ha a tất đà dạ ta bà ha. Gỉa kiết ra a tất đà dạ ta bà ha. Ba đà ma yết tất đà dạ, ta bà ha. Na ra cẩn trì bàn dà ra dạ ta bà ha. Ma bà lị thắng yết ra dạ ta bà ha.
Nam mô hắc ra đát na đá ra mạ da, Nam mô a rị da bà lô yết đế, thước bàn ra dạ, ta bà ha. Án tất điện đô, mạn đa ra, bạt đà dạ, ta bà ha.
 
 2. Text with the verses numbered from 1 to 84, then translated into modern Vietnamese  and English:
<blockquote>
-01. Nam mô hát (hoặc: hắc) ra đát na đá ra dạ da → Kính lạy Tam Bảo (Homage to the Three Jewels)
-02. Nam mô A rị a → Kính lạy Chư Thánh hiền (Homage to ārya)
-03. Bà lô yết đế thước bát ra da → Avalokiteśvara   (Avalokiteśvara) 
-04. Bồ đề Tát đá bà da→ Bồ Đề Tát (Boddhisatva)
-05. Ma ha Tát đá bà da → Sự vị đại  (Mahāsattva)
-06. Ma ha ca lô ni ca da → Lòng Từ Bi vĩ đại  (The Great Compassionate One)
-07. Án → Án (Oṃ)
-08. Tát bàn ra phạt duệ → Người bảo vệ khỏi mọi nguy hiểm  (Protector from all dangers)
-09. Số đát na đát tả → Vượt qua nỗi sợ hãi  (Overcoming fear)
-10. Nam mô tất cát lị đóa y mông A rị a → Kính lạy và sùng bái chư Thánh Thiên  (Homage and adoration to ārya)
-11. Bà lô cát đế thất phật ra lăng đà bà →  Avalokisteśvara  (Avalokisteśvara)
-12. Nam mô Na ra cẩn trì →  Kính lạy Nīlakaṇṭha   (tên= Cổ Xanh )  (Homage to Nīlakaṇṭha (name= Blue throat)
-13. Ha rị Ma ha Bàn đà sa mế → Con sẽ tụng lên bài Tâm Chú  (I shall enunciate the heart (dharani)
-14. Tát bà a tha đậu thâu bằng → Làm cho tất cả chúng sinh chiến thắng  (Make all beings victorious)
-15. A thệ dựng → Bất khả chiến bại  (Invincible)
-16. Tát bá tát đá ( Na ma bà tát đá) → Loại bỏ những ảo tưởng thanh lọc tất cả chúng sinh (Which removes illusions and purifies all beings)
-17. Ma phạt đặc đậu → Trên những con đường của sự tồn tại  (On the path of existence')
-18. Đát điệt tha. Án → Là như sau  (Thus. Om)
-19. A bà lô hê →Ánh huy hoàng  (Glorious Light)
-20. Lô ca đế → Siêu việt  (Transcendence)
-21. Ca la đế (hoặc) Ca ra đế)  → Chiếu sáng  (Radiance)
-22. Di Hê rị (hoặc : Ha ri) → Ôi Harị (là 1 trong các tên của Vishnu)  (O Hari (one of the names of Vishnu))
-23. Ma ha Bồ đề tát đỏa → Chư Đại Bồ Tát  (The Great Bodhisattva)
-24. Tát bà Tát bà → Tất cả chúng sinh  (All sentient beings)
-25. Ma ra Ma ra → Hãy nhớ, hãy nhớ …  (Remember, remember…)
-26. Ma hê Ma hê rị đà dựng →  …bài Tâm Chú của con  (… my Heart dhāraṇī)
-27. Câu lô câu lô yết mông → Hành động, hãy hành động  (Take action, let's act)
-28. Độ lô độ lô, Phạt sà da đế → Tiếp tục, hãy tiếp tục, Cho đến khi chiến thắng  (Keep going, keep going, Until you win)
-29. Ma ha phạt sà da đế → Chiến thắng vẻ vang  (A glorious victory )
-30. Đà ra đà ra → Giữ chặt   (Hold tight , hold tight)
-31. Địa rị ni → Hỡi Đức Vua …   (O King …)
-32. Thất Phật ra da → … Của Địa Cầu— (… of the Earth)
-33. Da ra Da ra (hoặc : Giá ra Gia rá) →  Tiến lên Tiến lên (Go ahead Go ahead)
-34. Ma ma phạt ma ra →  Thần tượng …  (God …)
-35. Mục đế lệ → … không tì vết ...   (… flawless ...)
-36. Di hê di hê → ... hãy đến, hãy đến ...  (...come, come ...)
-37. Thất na Thất na → ...với con rắn màu đen … (...with a black snake …)
-38. A ra sấm Phật ra xá lị → … phá hủy …  ( …that destroys …)
-39. Phạt sa phạt sấm →  …chất độc ...  ( …poisons)
-40. Phật ra xá da → ... Đấng Tối cao   (O Supreme Being)
-41. Hô lô Hô lô ma ra → Xin nhanh lên, xin nhanh lên, hỡi Ngài Dũng Mãnh   (Quick, Quick O Strong Being) 
-42. Hô lô Hô lô hê rị → Xin nhanh lên , Xin nhanh lên , hỡi Ngài Hari   (Quick, Quick O Hari)
-43. Ta ra Ta ra (hoặc : Sa ra, Sa ra) →  Hãy xuống,  Hãy xuống  (Come down Come down)
-44. Tất lị Tất lị →  Đến, Đến   (Come, Come)
-45. Tô lô Tô lô →  Hạ cố Hạ cố  (Condescend, Condescend)
-46. Bồ đề dạ Bồ đề dạ → Bậc đã giác ngộ Bậc đã giác ngộ   (Being enlightened , Being enlightened)
-47. Bồ đà dạ Bồ đà dạ → Xin ngài hãy giác ngộ con, Xin ngài hãy giác ngộ con   (Please enlighten me, Please enlighten me
-48. Di đế rị dạ → Nhân từ  (Benevolent)
-49. Na ra cẩn trì →  Nīlakaṇṭha   (Nīlakaṇṭha )
-50. Địa rị sắt ni na →  Xin ngài hãy làm cho tim con an lạc …  (Please gladden my heart …)
-51. Ba dạ ma na →  … bằng cách hiện ra trong tim con  (… by appearing unto me)
-52.  Ta bà ha (hoặc : Sa bà ha)  → Con xin đón mừng Ngài   (I welcome you)
-53. Tất đà dạ → Sư phụ đã hoàn thành  (To the accomplished Master)
-54. Ta bà ha  → Con xin đón mừng Ngài   (I welcome you)
-55. Ma ha Tất đà dạ → Người Thầy vĩ đại đã hoàn thành  (The Great accomplished Master)
-56. Ta bà ha  → Con xin đón mừng Ngài   (I welcome you)
-57. Tất bà dụ nghệ  Tâm trí hoàn toàn …   (Perfect mind …)
-58. Thất phàn ra da →  …  giác ngộ ( … fully enlightened)
-59. Ta bà ha → Con xin đón mừng Ngài   (I welcome you)
-60. Na ra cẩn trì →  Nīlakaṇṭha    (Nīlakaṇṭha )
-61. Ta bà ha → Con xin đón mừng Ngài   (I welcome you)
-62. Ma ra na ra → Người có gương mặt Heo rừng đực  (To the One with a face of a Wild Boar )
-63. Ta bà ha  → Con xin đón mừng Ngài   (I welcome you)
-64. Tất ra tăng a Mục da da → Người có gương mặt Sư tử  (To the One with a face of a Lion )
-65. Ta bà ha → Con xin đón mừng Ngài   (I welcome you)
-66. Sa bà ma ha a tất đà dạ → Người mang trong tay cái chùy  (To the One with a gada in the hand)
-67. Ta bà ha  → Con xin đón mừng Ngài   (I welcome you)
-68. Giả cát ra a tất đà dạ → Người cầm trên tay chiếc bánh xe  (To the One with a discus in the hand)
-69. Ta bà ha → Con xin đón mừng Ngài   (I welcome you)
-70. Ba đà ma yết tất đà dạ→ Người mang trên tay hoa sen  (To the One with a lotus in the hand)
-71. Ta bà ha → Con xin đón mừng Ngài   (I welcome you)
-72. Na ra cẩn trì Bàn dà ra da →  Nīlakaṇṭha , Đấng linh thiêng nhất  (Nīlakaṇṭha , The most sacred)
-73. Ta bà ha  → Con xin đón mừng Ngài   (I welcome you)
-74. Ma bà lị thắng yết ra dạ → Để được mạnh mẽ, để được tốt lành  (In order to be strong, in order to be good)
-75. Ta bà ha → Con xin đón mừng Ngài   (I welcome you)
-76. Nam mô hát (hoặc: hắc) ra đát na đá ra dạ da → Kính lạy Tam Bảo  (Homage to the Three Jewels)
-77. Nam mô A rị a → Kính lạy Chư Thánh hiền  (Homage to ārya)
-78. Bà lô yết đế → Avalokite …( phần đầu của tên)  (Avalokite … (beginning of name)
-79. thước bát ra da → … svaraya (phần cuối của tên = Avalokiteśvara)  ( … svaraya (end of name= Avalokiteśvara)
-80. Ta bà ha → Con xin đón mừng Ngài   (I welcome you)
-81. Án. Tất điện đô ... → (xem mục 83)  (see verse 83) 
-82. ... Mạn đá ra ... → (xem mục 83 ) (see verse 83) 
-83. ... Bạt đà da  → Cầu xin những lời trì chú trở thành hiện thực  (May the wishes of this mantra come true)
-84. Ta bà ha → Con xin đón mừng Ngài   (I welcome you).
</blockquote>
3. Reconstructed text in Sanskrit IAST:
The following is a reconstruction of the text in Sanskrit IAST by the vietnamese historian Lê Tự Hỷ who proposes a division into five parts, close to that of Lokesh Chandra. It is divided into 18 grammatically structured sentences (one can notice that the terms "dhāraṇī" and "mantra" are used alternately).
I. Lời chào mở đầu (Opening greeting) :
-01. Namo ratna-trayāya 
-02. Nama āryāvalokiteśvarāya bodhisattvāya mahā-sattvāya mahā-kāruṇikāya
II. Danh hiệu của đức Quán Tự Tại (Title Announcement of the Righteous Quán Tự Tại (One of the Names of Avalokiteśvara in Old Vietnamese ) 
-03. Oṃ sarva-bhayeṣu trāṇa-karāya tasya namaskṛtvā imam Āryāvalokiteśvara-stavanaṃ Nīlakaṇṭha-nāma 
III. Sự tụng lên câu kệ về Công đức của bài Tâm Chú (Benefits of reciting the mantra)
-04. hṛdayaṃ vartayisyāmi sarvārtha-sādhanaṃ śubham  
-05. ajeyam sarva-bhūtānām bhava-mārga-viśodhakam 
IV. Dhāraṇī (Các câu chú) ( Dhāraṇī (all verses)
-06. Tadyathā: Om Ālokapate lokātikrānta 
-07. Ehi Hare mahā-bodhisattva sarpa-sarpa smara- smara mama hṛdayam 
-08. Kuru-kuru karma dhuru-dhuru vijayate mahā-vijayate 
-09. Dhara-dhara dharaṇī-rāja cala-cala mama vimala-mūrte 
-10. ehi ehi kṛṣṇa-sarpopavīta viṣa- viṣaṃ praṇāśaya 
-11. Hulu-hulu Malla hulu-hulu Hare sara-sara siri-siri suru-suru  
-12. Bodhiya-bodhiya bodhaya-bodhaya maitreya Nīlakaṇṭha darśanena prahlādaya manaḥ svāhā 
-13. siddhāya svāhā mahā-siddhāya svāhā siddhayogīśvarāya svāhā 
-14. Nīlakaṇṭhāya svāhā varāha-mukhāya svāhā narasiṃha-mukhāya svāhā 
-15. Gada-hastāya svāhā cakra-hastāya svāhā padma-hastāya svāhā
-16. Nīlakaṇṭha-vyāghrāya svāhā Mahābali-Śaṅkarāya svāhā 
V. Lời chào kết thúc (Final greeting ) 
-17. Namo ratna-trayāya Nama āryāvalokiteśvarāya bodhisattvāya svāhā
-18. Oṃ sidhyantu me mantra padāni svāhā.
|}

Branches
Mahāyāna traditions

The overall doctrinal position of Vietnamese Buddhism is the inclusive system of Tiantai, with the higher metaphysics informed by the Huayan school; however, the orientation of Vietnamese Buddhism is syncretic without making such distinctions.  Therefore, modern practice of Vietnamese Buddhism can be very eclectic, including elements from Thiền (Chan Buddhism), Thiên Thai (Tiantai), and Tịnh độ Pure Land Buddhism. Vietnamese Buddhist are often separated not by sects but by the style in how they perform and recite texts, which monks of different regions of Vietnam are known for. According to Charles Prebish, many English language sources contain misconceptions regarding the variety of doctrines and practices in traditional Vietnamese Buddhism:

The methods of Pure Land Buddhism are perhaps the most widespread within Vietnam. It is common for practitioners to recite sutras, chants and dhāraṇīs looking to gain protection through bodhisattvas. It is a devotional practice where those practicing put their faith in Amitābha. Followers believe they will gain rebirth in his pure land by chanting Amitabha's name. A pure land is a Buddha-realm where one can more easily attain enlightenment since suffering does not exist there.

Many religious organizations have not been recognized by the government; however, in 2007, with 1.5 million followers, the Vietnamese Pure Land Buddhism Association (Tịnh Độ Cư Sĩ Phật Hội Việt Nam) received official recognition as an independent and legal religious organization.

Thiền is the Sino-Xenic pronunciation of Chan (Japanese Zen) and is derived ultimately from Sanskrit "dhyāna". The traditional account is that in 580, an Indian monk named Vinitaruci traveled to Vietnam after completing his studies with Sengcan, the third patriarch of Chan Buddhism. This would be the first appearance of Thiền. The sect that Vinitaruci and his lone Vietnamese disciple founded would become known as the oldest branch of Thiền. After a period of obscurity, the Vinitaruci School became one of the most influential Buddhist groups in Vietnam by the 10th century, particularly under the patriarch Vạn-Hạnh (died 1018). Other early Vietnamese Zen schools included the Vô Ngôn Thông, which was associated with the teaching of Mazu Daoyi, and the Thảo Đường, which incorporated nianfo chanting techniques; both were founded by Chinese monks.

A new Thiền school was founded by King Trần Nhân Tông (1258–1308); called the Trúc Lâm "Bamboo Grove" school, it evinced a deep influence from Confucian and Taoist philosophy. Nevertheless, Trúc Lâm's prestige waned over the following centuries as Confucianism became dominant in the royal court. In the 17th century, a group of Chinese monks led by Nguyên Thiều introduced the Linji school (Lâm Tế). A more native offshoot of Lâm Tế, the Liễu Quán school, was founded in the 18th century and has since been the predominant branch of Vietnamese Zen.

Some scholars argue that the importance and prevalence of Thiền in Vietnam has been greatly overstated and that it has played more of an elite rhetorical role than a role of practice. The Thiền uyển tập anh ("Collection of Outstanding Figures of the Zen Garden") has been the dominant text used to legitimize Thiền lineages and history within Vietnam. However, Cuong Tu Nguyen's Zen in Medieval Vietnam: A Study and Translation of the Thien Tap Anh (1997) gives a critical review of how the text has been used to create a history of Zen Buddhism that is "fraught with discontinuity". Modern Buddhist practices are not reflective of a Thiền past; in Vietnam, common practices are more focused on ritual and devotion than the Thiền focus on meditation. Nonetheless, Vietnam is seeing a steady growth in Zen today. Two figures who have been responsible for this increased interest in Thiền are Thích Nhất Hạnh, and Thích Thanh Từ, who lives in Da Lat.

Theravada Buddhism

The central and southern part of present-day Vietnam were originally inhabited by the Chams and the Khmer people, respectively, who followed both a syncretic Śaiva-Mahayana (see History of Buddhism in Cambodia). Theravāda spread from Sri Lanka to Cambodia during the 15th and 16th centuries, became established as the state religion in Cambodia and also spread to Cambodians living in the Mekong Delta, replaced Mahayana. Đại Việt annexed the land occupied by the Cham during conquests in the 15th century and by the 18th century had also annexed the southern portion of the Khmer Empire, resulting in the current borders of Vietnam. From that time onward, the dominant Đại Việt (Vietnamese) followed the Mahayana tradition while the Khmer people continued to practice Theravada Buddhism.

In the 1920s and 1930s, there were a number of movements in Vietnam for the revival and modernization of Buddhist activities. Together with the re-organization of Mahayana establishments, there developed a growing interest in Theravadin meditation as well as the Pāli Canon. These were then available in French. Among the pioneers who brought Theravada Buddhism to the ethnic Đại Việt was a young veterinary doctor named Lê Văn Giảng. He was born in the Southern region, received higher education in Hanoi, and after graduation, was sent to Phnom Penh, Cambodia, to work for the French government.

During that time, he became especially interested in Theravada Buddhist practice. Subsequently, he decided to ordain and took the Dhamma name of Hộ-Tông (Vansarakkhita). In 1940, upon an invitation from a group of lay Buddhists led by Nguyễn Văn Hiểu, he went back to Vietnam in order to help establish the first Theravadin temple for Vietnamese Buddhists at Gò Dưa, Thủ Đức (now a district of Hồ Chí Minh City). The temple was named Bửu Quang (Ratana Ramsyarama). The temple was destroyed by French troops in 1947, and was later rebuilt in 1951. At Bửu Quang temple, together with a group of Vietnamese bhikkhus who had received training in Cambodia such as Thiện Luật, Bửu Chơn, Kim Quang and Giới Nghiêm, Hộ Tông began teaching Buddhism in their native Vietnamese. He also translated many Buddhist materials from the Pali Canon, and Theravada Buddhism became part of Vietnamese Buddhist activity in the country.

In 1949–1950, Hộ Tông together with Nguyễn Văn Hiểu and supporters built a new temple in Saigon (now Hồ Chí Minh City), named Kỳ Viên Tự (Jetavana Vihara). This temple became the centre of Theravadin Buddhist activities in Vietnam, which continued to attract increasing interest among the Vietnamese Buddhists. In 1957, the Vietnamese Theravada Buddhist Sangha Congregation (Giáo hội Tăng-già Nguyên thủy Việt Nam) was formally established and recognised by the government, and the Theravada Sangha elected Venerable Hộ Tông as its first President, or Sangharaja.

From Saigon, the Theravadin Buddhist movement spread to other provinces, and soon, a number of Theravadin temples for ethnic Viet Buddhists were established in many areas in the Southern and Central parts of Vietnam. There are 529 Theravadin Buddhist temples throughout the country, of which 19 were located in Hồ Chí Minh City and its vicinity. Besides Bửu Quang and Kỳ Viên temples, other well known temples are Bửu Long, Giác Quang, Tam Bảo (Đà Nẵng), Thiền Lâm and Huyền Không (Huế), and the large Thích Ca Phật Đài in Vũng Tàu.

There is also a branch of Theravada Buddhism that also combines elements from the Mahayana tradition which is called Mendicant Buddhism or in Vietnamese, Đạo Phật Khất Sĩ Việt Nam, it was created by Thích Minh Đăng Quang, who wanted to create the original Buddhist tradition by walking barefoot and begging for alms.

 Gallery 

See also

Trúc Lâm
Vietnamese Thiền
Vô Ngôn Thông
Thiền uyển tập anh
Thích Ca Phật Đài
Mahapanya Vidayalai
Buddhist Sangha of Vietnam
Vietnamese Buddhist Youth Association
Unified Buddhist Sangha of Vietnam
Buddhist temples in Huế
Buddhist crisis

Notes

 References 
 Nguyen, Cuong Tu & A. W. Barber. "Vietnamese Buddhism in North America: Tradition and Acculturation". in Charles S. Prebish and Kenneth K. Tanaka (eds) The Faces of Buddhism in America. Berkeley: University of California Press, 1998.
 Nguyen, Cuong Tu. Zen in Medieval Vietnam: A Study of the Thiền Uyển Tập Anh. Honolulu: University of Hawaii Press, 1997.
 
 Soucy, Alexander. "Nationalism, Globalism and the Re-establishment of the Trúc Lâm Thien Sect in Northern Vietnam." Philip Taylor (ed). Modernity and Re-enchantment: Religion in Post-revolutionary Vietnam''. Institute of Southeast Asian Studies: Singapore, 2007
Ven.Phra Palad Raphin Buddhisaro. (2017).  Theravada Buddhism: Identity, Ethnic, Retention of “Khmer’s Krom” in Vietnam. Journal of Bodhi Research [Bodhi Vijjalai Collage] Srinakharinwiwot University http://gps.mcu.ac.th/wp-content/uploads/2013/02/11004-32450-1-SM-1.pdf
Ven.Phra Palad Raphin Buddhisaro. (2018). Annam Nikaya Buddhism on Vietnamese Style in Thailand: History and Development. International Conference, Thu Dau Mot University-Trường Đại Học Thủ Dầu Một Thu Dau Mot City, Binh Duong Province, Vietnam. 7–8 December 2561 http://gps.mcu.ac.th/wp-content/uploads/2016/09/Paper_Annam-Chaiyaphum-Journal.pdf
Mae Chee Huynh Kim Lan.(2553/2010) A STUDY OF THERAVĀDA BUDDHISM IN VIETNAM.Thesis of Master of Arts (Buddhist Studies).Graduate School : Mahachulalongkornrajavidyalaya University.References related to the Chú Đại Bi'''

Further reading
 DeVido, Elise A. (2009). The Influence of Chinese Master Taixu on Buddhism in Vietnam, Journal of Global Buddhism 10, 413–458

External links

Phật Học Online

 
Vietnam
Buddhism
Vietnam